Shōtoku may refer to:

 Prince Shōtoku (574-622), a politician of the Asuka period
 Empress Kōken, or Empress Shōtoku (718-770), the 48th imperial ruler of Japan
 Shōtoku (era) (1711–1716), a Japanese era